Jacqueline "Jackie" Louise Cruz Silva,  (born February 13, 1962 in Rio de Janeiro) is a retired female volleyball player from Brazil, who won the gold medal in the inaugural women's beach volleyball tournament at the 1996 Summer Olympics, partnering Sandra Pires.

Silva was first drafted by the Brazil women's national volleyball team at the age of 14. She was part of the team who took Brazil to its first Olympics, 1980 Moscow and 1984 Los Angeles. She was known for her aggressive temperament, which led the Confederação Brasileira de Voleibol to cut her from the national team three times. In 1987 she left Brazil and played in Italy. In 1988, she went to the United States to become a beach volleyball player, with Linda Chisholm as her first partner. In 1993 she joined Sandra Pires, with whom she won two world championships and the Olympic gold.

In 2015, Silva joined the Florida International University coaching staff as a volunteer assistant with the Women's Sand Volleyball team under Head Coach Rita Crockett.

At the 2016 Summer Olympics Silva was inducted into the Olympians for Life project for her work with the poor.

Personal life

Silva is openly lesbian and has a relationship with the ballerina Amália Lima.

References

External links
  
 Florida International Coaching Bio
 

1962 births
Living people
Brazilian women's volleyball players
Brazilian women's beach volleyball players
Olympic beach volleyball players of Brazil
Olympic volleyball players of Brazil
Olympic gold medalists for Brazil
Olympic medalists in beach volleyball
Volleyball players at the 1980 Summer Olympics
Volleyball players at the 1984 Summer Olympics
Beach volleyball players at the 1996 Summer Olympics
Volleyball players from Rio de Janeiro (city)
Medalists at the 1996 Summer Olympics
LGBT volleyball players
Brazilian LGBT sportspeople
Lesbian sportswomen